Inquisitor arctatus is a species of sea snail, a marine gastropod mollusk in the family Pseudomelatomidae, the turrids and allies.

Description
The length of the shell attains 49,8 mm, its diameter 13,1 mm

Distribution
This marine species occurs off Zululand to Transkei, South Africa; also off the Philippines.

References

 Kilburn, R.N., 1988. Turridae (Mollusca: Gastropoda) of southern Africa and Mozambique. Part 4. Subfamilies Drilliinae, Crassispirinae and Strictispirinae. Annals of the Natal Museum 29(1): 167-320

External links
 
 
 Biolib.cz: Inquisitor arctatus

arctatus
Gastropods described in 1988